In line with the Arab League position in relation to Israel, Oman does not officially recognize the state of Israel and took part in the boycott of Israel during much of the 20th century.

In 1994, the countries established unofficial trade relations, which were discontinued in 2000. In 2018, Israeli Prime Minister Benjamin Netanyahu led a delegation to Oman and met with Sultan Qaboos and other senior Omani officials. In February 2019, Omani foreign minister, Yusuf bin Alawi, said that Oman will not normalize its relations with Israel until a sovereign Palestinian state has been established. In 2020, after Sultan Qaboos died, the Israeli PM commended Qaboos and gave his condolences.

In 2023, Oman announced it will allow Israeli aircraft to fly over its airspace, shortening flight times to Far East destinations.

History

Background
Unlike most other nations in the region, Oman has not participated in any of the armed conflicts fought between the Arab states and Israel.

Establishment of relations (1994–2000)
In 1994, then-Prime Minister of Israel Yitzhak Rabin visited Oman, where he was greeted by Sultan of Oman Qaboos bin Said al Said in Muscat. Among other things, the two sides discussed issues such as sharing water and how to improve water supplies. In 1995, a few days after Rabin was assassinated, then-acting prime minister Shimon Peres hosted Omani foreign minister Yusuf bin Alawi bin Abdullah in Jerusalem.

In January 1996, Israel and Oman signed an agreement on the reciprocal opening of trade representative offices.

Frozen relations (2000–18)
Official relations were frozen with the outbreak of the Second Intifada in October 2000. Still, in 2008, Oman's Foreign Affairs Minister Yusuf bin Alawi bin Abdullah met with Israeli Foreign Minister Tzipi Livni during their visit to Qatar.

Visit by Israeli prime minister (2018)
In October 2018, Israeli prime minister Benjamin Netanyahu met Sultan Qaboos bin Said al Said in Muscat; the visit was revealed following Netanyahu's return to Israel. Right after the visit, Omani Foreign Minister Yusuf bin Alawi bin Abdullah described Israel as an "accepted Middle East state." He said, "The world is also aware of this fact. Maybe it is time for Israel to be treated the same [as others states] and also bear the same obligations." In April 2019, bin Abdullah said that "Arabs must take initiatives to make Israel overcome 'fears for its future' in the region."

References

Israel–Oman relations
Oman
Bilateral relations of Oman